GRB2-related adapter protein 2 also known as GRB2-related adaptor downstream of Shc (GADS) is a 37 kDa protein that in humans is encoded by the GRAP2 gene.

Function 

This gene encodes a member of the GRB2/Sem5/Drk family. This member is an adaptor-like protein involved in leukocyte-specific protein-tyrosine kinase signaling. Like its related family member, GRB2-related adaptor protein (GRAP), this protein contains an SH2 domain flanked by two SH3 domains. This protein interacts with other proteins, such as GRB2-associated binding protein 1 (GAB1) and the SLP-76 leukocyte protein (LCP2), through its SH3 domains. Transcript variants utilizing alternative polyA sites exist.

Interactions 

GRAP2 has been shown to interact with:

 CCNDBP1, 
 CD28, 
 Linker of activated T cells, 
 Lymphocyte cytosolic protein 2 
 MAP4K1, and
 STAMBP.

References

Further reading